New Inn is a small village located in Carmarthenshire, Wales with a population of 348.  It is situated along the A485 A road between Llanllwni and Gwyddgrug, approximately four miles from the village of Pencader. It is a linear settlement consisting of around sixty houses and a chapel.

History
New Inn developed at the crossroads of a Roman road, Sarn Helen, going from south to north, and a track that later became a drovers' road going from west to east.

The village was the commercial centre of the area by the mid 19th Century, with three public houses, a general store exporting vast quantities of butter and cheese to Carmarthen docks and an inn, 'The Traveller's Rest'. The village experienced a decline in trade due to the opening of a railway in the nearby settlement of Pencader. The community school in the village opened in 1881.

In 2007, the school was closed by the LEA due to a decline in the number of pupils and financial concerns. The two remaining public houses and the general store in the village have also closed.

As of July 2013, there is an agricultural machinery merchant, engineering company, dairy farm, and tour operator based in the village, as well as a Methodist chapel.

Transport
The village is located on the A485 A road which connects it to the nearby towns of Carmarthen and Lampeter. There are also numerous public footpaths and bridleways which connect it to the nearby villages of Pencader and Gwyddgrug.

The TrawsCymru T1 bus service, which starts in Lampeter and ends in Carmarthen stops hourly in the village. The 701 bus, which ends in Cardiff, stops on a daily basis.

Demographics
According to the 2011 Census, 212 of the 336 residents in the village aged 3 or over can understand spoken Welsh (63%). The census also reported that 195 residents (58%) can speak Welsh. The population in 2001 was 306, suggesting an increase.

Image gallery

Nearby areas

External links
 Pencader & District Regeneration Group Website

References

Villages in Carmarthenshire